Abacetus alesi is a species of ground beetle in the subfamily Pterostichinae. It was described by Jedlicka in 1936 with the species being found in Indonesia and Philippines, Asia.

References

alesi
Beetles described in 1936
Insects of Southeast Asia